Benito Floro Sanz (born 2 June 1952) is a Spanish football manager.

Football career
Floro was born in Gijón, Asturias. During his professional career he managed Albacete Balompié (two spells, starting off in 1989 in Segunda División B and leading the club to a first-ever La Liga promotion in just two years), Real Madrid (winning the Copa del Rey in his first season), Sporting de Gijón, Vissel Kobe, C.F. Monterrey, Villarreal CF– he had already coached the Valencians in the third tier – RCD Mallorca (leaving the Balearic Islands side after just a few months after being appointed in the summer of 2004) and Barcelona SC.

Starting in 2005, Floro briefly worked for former club Real Madrid as director of football, then switched to sports commentator with Telecinco. On 5 July 2013, the Canadian Soccer Association announced him as the new manager of the national team, taking over from interim coach Colin Miller on 1 August.

On 14 September 2016, Floro's contract was not renewed after failing to qualify the team for the 2018 FIFA World Cup. On 23 December, he was appointed at Liga Deportiva Alajuelense in the Costa Rican Liga FPD.

Personal life
Floro's son, Antonio, was also a football coach. He worked in Canada too.

Honours

Manager
Albacete
Segunda División: 1990–91
Segunda División B: 1989–90

Real Madrid
Copa del Rey: 1992–93
Supercopa de España: 1993

Villarreal
UEFA Intertoto Cup: 2003

References

External links

1952 births
Living people
Sportspeople from Gijón
Spanish football managers
La Liga managers
Segunda División managers
Segunda División B managers
Tercera División managers
CF Gandía managers
Villarreal CF managers
Albacete Balompié managers
Real Madrid CF managers
Sporting de Gijón managers
RCD Mallorca managers
J1 League managers
Vissel Kobe managers
Barcelona S.C. managers
Botola managers
Wydad AC managers
Liga MX managers
C.F. Monterrey managers
L.D. Alajuelense managers
Canada men's national soccer team managers
2015 CONCACAF Gold Cup managers
Spanish expatriate football managers
Expatriate football managers in Japan
Expatriate football managers in Mexico
Expatriate football managers in Ecuador
Expatriate football managers in Morocco
Expatriate soccer managers in Canada
Expatriate football managers in Costa Rica
Spanish expatriate sportspeople in Japan
Spanish expatriate sportspeople in Mexico
Spanish expatriate sportspeople in Ecuador
Spanish expatriate sportspeople in Morocco
Spanish expatriate sportspeople in Canada